A calendar is a catalogue, list or table, most commonly used for a table of days, months, years etc.

Calendar may also refer to:
 Calendar (archives), a descriptive inventory or summary of archival documents
 Calendar of saints, a traditional Christian method of organizing a liturgical year
 Calendar (stationery), a physical object consisting of a table of days, months, years etc.
 Annual calendar (horology), indicating the date or the day, by number or by name (full or abridged), either by watch hands or rotating disk
 Calendar Man, a DC Comics supervillain character

Film and television
 Calendar (British TV programme), a news and current affairs programme broadcast on ITV Yorkshire in the United Kingdom
 Calendar (American TV program), a weekday morning news and information program shown in the United States on CBS from 1961 to 1963
 Calendar (1993 film), a 1993 film directed by Atom Egoyan
 Calendar (2009 film), a 2009 Malayalam film directed by Mahesh
 Calendar (2017 film) a 2017 Assamese film directed by Homjyoti Talukdar

Applications and services
 Calendaring software, software with a calendar and scheduling possibilities
 Calendar (Apple), a Mac OS X calendar application made by Apple Inc.
 Calendar (Ubuntu), a calendar application integrated into Ubuntu
 Calendar (Windows), a calendar application integrated into certain versions of Microsoft Windows
 Google Calendar, a web-based calendar service and mobile application
 Outlook Calendar on Outlook.com, formerly named Calendar, a consumer web-based calendar service

See also
 The Calendar (disambiguation)
 Calender, a device for smoothing paper
 Callander, a burgh in the region of Stirling, Scotland
 Callendar (disambiguation)
 Callender (disambiguation)
 Colander, a type of sieve
 Qalandar (disambiguation)